Memorial Stadium is an outdoor athletic stadium in Seattle, Washington, used mostly for American football, ultimate and soccer, located in the northeast corner of the Seattle Center grounds. It has a seating capacity of 12,000; this was temporarily expanded to 17,000 during 1974–75, while the Seattle Sounders, of the North American Soccer League, played at Memorial Stadium, before moving to the newly constructed Kingdome. Similarly, an A-League reincarnation of the Sounders franchise played at Memorial Stadium, before moving to Lumen Field. It currently hosts Seattle School District high school football games and adult recreational leagues, and is the home field for the Seattle Cascades of the American Ultimate Disc League.

History

The stadium was designed by Seattle architect George W. Stoddard, also known for his work on the Green Lake Aqua Theater and the south stands of Husky Stadium. The stadium opened on September 26, 1947, during a "jamboree" featuring eight of the city's high school football teams. Memorial Stadium was dedicated later that year in memory of the Seattle youth who gave their lives in World War II. A memorial wall at the east end is inscribed with the names of over 700 fallen individuals. The following year, the stadium hosted first widespread local television broadcast in the Puget Sound region, the Turkey Day high school football game between West Seattle and Wenatchee.

The stadium was the venue for much of the opening ceremonies for the Century 21 Exposition, a World's Fair held in Seattle in 1962. In 1967, it became the first high school stadium in the country to install artificial turf.

In 1992, the scoreboard was replaced and the field was rededicated as "Leon H. Brigham Field", in tribute to the long-time high school football coach who pushed to build Memorial Stadium while serving as the Seattle School District's first Director of Athletics. The scoreboard was again replaced in 2018. Plans to replace the turf surface and widen the field area were also announced prior to a visit by Major League Soccer officials in 1994 to determine its suitability to host a Seattle team.

In 2017, the Seattle School District and the city of Seattle announced plans to build a new high school and stadium at Seattle Center in response to major population growth in downtown Seattle. While no timetable has been set for construction, and no site has yet been chosen, the current Memorial Stadium site was seen as a likely location for the new project because the city and school district had agreed in 2009 that the current stadium should be torn down. In October 2018, a design studio leaked renderings of a soccer-specific stadium on the site of Memorial Stadium that was commissioned for a feasibility study.

Tenants
The facility is not operated by the Seattle Center itself, but is owned by the Seattle School District and still serves as the "home field" for some high school football games played within the district. Memorial Stadium also hosted the first AAA (now 4A) state championship game for high school football in 1973, the first year of the state playoff system. The top-ranked Wenatchee Panthers were upset by the Kentridge Chargers, 26–24. Entering the title game, Wenatchee had given up just seven points all season and had been the top team in the state polls for four years.

As well as hosting two iterations of the Sounders franchise, Memorial Stadium has served as home to several other pro and semi-pro sports teams. From 1967 to 1969 it was the home of the Seattle Rangers of the Continental Football League, a professional minor league. The Seattle Majestics, a women's American football team, played home games at Memorial Stadium from 2007 to 2009 before moving to French Field in nearby Kent. Seattle Reign FC, now known as OL Reign, of the National Women's Soccer League moved to the stadium in 2014 and played with a capacity limited to 6,000 for several seasons. They announced their move to Tacoma in January 2019. As of 2015, the AUDL's Seattle Cascades use the stadium for the majority of their home games. In addition, the stadium hosts adult recreational league soccer and flag football.

Memorial Stadium serves as the finish for the Seattle Marathon.

The stadium is also used periodically for concerts, particularly in connection with festivals held at the Center, like Bumbershoot.

References

External links

Seattle Center: Memorial Stadium

Seattle Sounders (1974–1983)
High school football venues in the United States
Sports venues in Seattle
Seattle Center
Soccer venues in Washington (state)
North American Soccer League (1968–1984) stadiums
National Women's Soccer League stadiums
OL Reign
Seattle Public Schools
Ultimate (sport) venues